The Fires of Antediluvia is the third EP by American art rock band Junius. It was released as a limited edition 7" vinyl through Radar Recordings and Anchorless Records on May 1, 2007. It was also made available as a digital download through Radar Recordings.

Release and distribution
The 7" vinyl release was limited to 500 copies. 250 copies were distributed through Radar Recordings and 250 through Anchorless Records. The 250 copies distributed through Radar Recordings were hand numbered and released in 5 different shades, with each shade representing the five elements: wind, water, fire, earth, and æther. The release was limited to one pressing, and is currently out-of-print.

Track listing

Notes
 "The Fires of Antediluvia" is an earlier version of the track "The Antediluvian Fires" which would later appear on the bands full-length album The Martyrdom of a Catastrophist.
 This is the band's first release to feature the current line-up, with Joel Munguia serving as the band's permanent bassist from this point on.

Personnel
Junius
 Joseph E. Martinez - guitar, vocals
 Michael Repasch-Nieves - guitar
 Joel Munguia - bass
 Dana Filloon - drums
Production
 P. J. Goodwin - recording
 Nick Zampiello - mastering

References

External links

2007 EPs
Junius (band) albums